Urunda (Orondo) is a rural locality (a village) in Akberdinsky Selsoviet, Iglinsky District, Bashkortostan, Russia. The population was 192 as of 2010. There are 8 streets.

Geography 
Urunda is located 55 km south of Iglino (the district's administrative centre) by road. Beloretsk is the nearest rural locality.

References 

Rural localities in Iglinsky District